Jason Michael Bosak Diakité (born 11 January 1975 in Lund), known under the stage name Timbuktu, is a Swedish rapper and reggae artist. In the mid-1990s, he started as part of the rap group Excel before going solo as Timbuktu. On March 1, 2020, he published the well-received memoir, A Drop of Midnight.  He has won several Grammis awards, the highest music awards in Sweden, including Lyricist of the Year and best Hip-hop Record of the Year.

Biography
He is the son of Madubuko Diakité, a U.S. born Swedish human rights lawyer and academic.

Timbuktu hosted the music aid radio/television show Musikhjälpen from its start in 2008 until 2012.

Discography

Albums
As part of Excel
1999: Bright Lights, Big City

Solo

Live albums

Singles
As part of Excel

Solo (as Timbuktu)

Featured in

Filmography
In April 2010 Arash released a video for "Dasa Bala" featuring Timbuktu, Yag and Aylar Lie, which was directed and edited by Fred Khoshtinat.

Notes

References

External links

JuJu Records Timbuktu's own record label
RBMA Radio On Demand – Fireside Chat – Sofi Hellborg feat. Tony Allen & Timbuktu (Ajabu, Sweden)

Swedish rappers
1975 births
Living people
Swedish-language singers
Swedish people of African-American descent
Swedish reggae musicians
Swedish people of American descent
Swedish people of Polish descent
Warner Music Sweden artists
Musikförläggarnas pris winners